Arasapura (Arasapuram) is a village located very near to the Davanagere city in Davanagere district of Karnataka, India.

Location 
It has an average elevation of 580 metres (1900 feet).

Languages 
Agriculture is the main stay for the entire village. People here speak Kannada, Telugu and the local tribal languages.

Demographics 
It is having a Population of 1036 of which Males constitute 532 and Females constitute 504.

References
 Arasapura Population Statistics 

Villages in Davanagere district